Shen Jie (born October 27, 1986 in Liantang, Qingpu district, Shanghai) is a Chinese male sprint canoeist who competed in the late 2000s. Shen competed two Olympic Games in 2008 and 2012, his personal best was that he took 8th at men's K-2 1000 m in 2008.

References

Sports-Reference.com profile

1986 births
Living people
Canoeists from Shanghai
Olympic canoeists of China
Canoeists at the 2008 Summer Olympics
Canoeists at the 2012 Summer Olympics
Chinese male canoeists